The Del Carmen River is the river of Chile. Its tributaries are:
 El Toro River
 Socarrón River
 Sancarrón River
 Del Medio River
 Primero River (Huasco)

See also
List of rivers of Chile

References
 Cuenca del Río Huasco, Dirección General de Aguas, Ministerio de Obras Públicas, Gobierno de Chile

Rivers of Chile
Rivers of Atacama Region